AMB may refer to:
 Active magnetic bearing
 Advanced Memory Buffer, used in Fully Buffered DIMM memory
 Al-Aqsa Martyrs Brigades, one of the armed sections of the Palestinian Fatah movement
 Ambergate railway station, abbreviation used in the (UK) National Rail code
 Ambilobe Airport, an airport serving Ambilobe, a city in the Antsiranana province in Madagascar by IATA airport code 
 American Medical Bureau, a humanitarian institution operating during the Spanish Civil War
 Amphotericin B, an anti-fungal drug
 Àrea Metropolitana de Barcelona, public body in Barcelona
 Axe Murder Boyz, a two-man rap group Otis & Bonez Dubb

Amb may refer to:
 Amb (Dadyal), a town in the Azad Kashmir territory, Pakistan
 Amb (princely state), a region in the former Pashtun Tanoli empire
 Amb, India, a town of the Himachal Pradesh State, India
 Amb, Pakistan, a village in the Khyber Pakhtunkhwa province of Pakistan
 Amb special form, a nondeterministic programming construct